Khaywan al-Hamra is a sub-district located in Harf Sufyan District, 'Amran Governorate, Yemen. Khaywan al-Hamra had a population of 3568 according to the 2004 census.

References 

Sub-districts in Harf Sufyan District